Euptera is an Afrotropical genus of brush-footed butterflies.

Species
Euptera amieti Collins & Libert, 1998
Euptera aurantiaca Amiet, 1998
Euptera choveti Amiet & Collins, 1998
Euptera collinsi Chovet & Libert, 1998
Euptera crowleyi (Kirby, 1889)
Euptera debruynei (Hecq, 1990)
Euptera dorothea Bethune-Baker, 1904
Euptera ducarmei Collins, 1998
Euptera elabontas (Hewitson, 1871)
Euptera falcata Libert, 1998
Euptera falsathyma Schultze, 1916
Euptera freyja Hancock, 1984
Euptera ginettae Libert, 2005
Euptera hirundo Staudinger, 1891
Euptera intricata Aurivillius, 1894
Euptera ituriensis Libert, 1998
Euptera kinugnana (Grose-Smith, 1889)
Euptera knoopi Libert & Chovet, 1998
Euptera liberti Collins, 1987
Euptera mimetica Collins & Amiet, 1998
Euptera mirabilis Libert, 2005
Euptera mirifica Carpenter & Jackson, 1950
Euptera mocquerysi Staudinger, 1893
Euptera neptunus Joicey & Talbot, 1924
Euptera nigeriensis Chovet, 1998
Euptera plantroui Chovet & Collins, 1998
Euptera pluto (Ward, 1873)
Euptera richelmanni Weymer, 1907
Euptera schultzei Libert & Chovet, 1998
Euptera semirufa Joicey & Talbot, 1921
Euptera zowa Fox, 1965

References

 
Limenitidinae
Nymphalidae genera
Taxa named by Otto Staudinger